William Smith O'Brien (March 14, 1860 – May 26, 1911) was an American Major League Baseball player who played first base. He was considered a "one-year wonder" and led the National League (NL) in home runs in 1887.

Baseball career
O'Brien was born in Albany, New York, in 1860. He started his professional baseball career in 1884 and spent most of the season with the St. Paul Apostles of the Northwestern League. In September, O'Brien made his major league debut in the Union Association, playing a total of 12 games for the St. Paul Saints and Kansas City Cowboys. He then played in the minor leagues in 1885 and 1886.

In March 1887, O'Brien was acquired by the NL's Washington Nationals. That season, he played 113 games, batting .278 with 73 runs batted in (RBI) and a 126 OPS+. He led the league in home runs, with 19. In 1888, O'Brien's play declined. He had a .225 batting average, 9 home runs, 66 RBI, and a 79 OPS+. In 1889, O'Brien played two games for the Nationals before being released in May. He spent the rest of the year with the Rochester Jingoes of the International League.

O'Brien returned to the majors in 1890 with the American Association's Brooklyn Gladiators. Just like in 1884, the addition of a third major league allowed him to receive playing time in the worst of the three circuits. In 96 games that season, O'Brien batted .278 with 4 home runs, 67 RBI, and a 121 OPS+. He played his last MLB game in August.

O'Brien played for various minor league teams from 1891 to 1896 before retiring from professional baseball. His 1887 season with Washington remained his best in either the majors or minors. In 356 career MLB games, O'Brien had a .256 batting average, 32 home runs, 206 RBI, and a 107 OPS+.

O'Brien died in Kansas City, Missouri, in 1911.

See also
List of Major League Baseball annual home run leaders

References

External links

Retrosheet

1860 births
1911 deaths
19th-century baseball players
Major League Baseball first basemen
National League home run champions
St. Paul Saints (UA) players
Kansas City Cowboys (UA) players
Washington Nationals (1886–1889) players
Brooklyn Gladiators players
St. Paul Apostles players
Kansas City Cowboys (minor league) players
Memphis Reds players
St. Paul Freezers players
Nashville Americans players
Rochester Jingoes players
Denver Grizzlies (baseball) players
Denver Mountaineers players
Sioux City Corn Huskers players
Indianapolis Hoosiers (minor league) players
Nashville Tigers players
Sioux City Cornhuskers players
Omaha Omahogs players
Denver (minor league baseball) players
Lincoln Treeplanters players
Jacksonville Jacks players
Springfield, Illinois (minor league baseball) players
Toledo Mud Hens players
Baseball players from New York (state)
Sportspeople from Albany, New York